Janov is a municipality and village in Děčín District in the Ústí nad Labem Region of the Czech Republic. It has about 300 inhabitants.

References

Villages in Děčín District
Bohemian Switzerland